The 2005 Oklahoma Sooners football team represented the University of Oklahoma in the 2005 NCAA Division I-A football season, the 111th season of Sooner football. The team was led by two-time Walter Camp Coach of the Year Award winner, Bob Stoops, in his seventh season as head coach. They played their home games at Gaylord Family Oklahoma Memorial Stadium in Norman, Oklahoma. They were a charter member of the Big 12 Conference.

Conference play began with a loss in the annual Red River Rivalry to the Texas Longhorns on October 8, and ended with a win at home in the annual Bedlam Series over the Oklahoma State Cowboys on November 26. The Sooners finished the regular season with a 7–4 record (6–2 in the Big 12), their worst record since 1999, finishing in a tie with Texas Tech for second in the Big 12 South. They were invited to the Holiday Bowl, where they upset the Oregon Ducks, 17–14.

Following the season, Davin Joseph was selected 23rd overall in the 2006 NFL Draft, along with Chris Chester in the 2nd round, Dusty Dvoracek, Travis Wilson and Clint Ingram in the 3rd, and J. D. Runnels in the 6th.

On July 11, 2007, the NCAA announced the Sooners would have to vacate every game from 2005 due to NCAA violations relating to Rhett Bomar and J.D. Quinn receiving money from a car dealership for work they did not perform. The punishment effectively gave the team a 0–4 record. However, on appeal, those wins were reinstated in early 2008.

Schedule

Game summaries

TCU

Tulsa

UCLA

Kansas State

Texas (Red River Rivalry)

Kansas

Baylor

Nebraska

Texas A&M

Texas Tech

Oklahoma State (Bedlam Series)

Oregon (Holiday Bowl)

Rankings

Statistics

Team

Scores by quarter

2006 NFL Draft

The 2006 NFL Draft was held on April 29–30, 2006 at the Radio City Music Hall in New York City. The following Oklahoma players were either selected or signed as undrafted free agents following the draft.

References

Oklahoma
Holiday Bowl champion seasons
Oklahoma Sooners football seasons
Oklahoma Sooners football